Anthony Fleming is an American actor who is known for his role as Trumpets on Fox's television series Prison Break and JP Gibbs on Starz Power Book IV: Force. 
He also appeared in the film Divergent and in an episode of Chicago Fire.   
Fleming is active in the Chicago theater scene and has appeared in the play Denmark at the Biograph Theater in Chicago.

References

External links

American male television actors
American male stage actors
Year of birth missing (living people)
Living people